Soviet submarine K-23 was a K-class submarine of the Soviet Navy during World War II. She was under command of captain Magomet Gadzhiyev (an ethnic Avar) until her loss in 1942.

Operational history 
Operating against Axis shipping in Norwegian waters, K-23 made both torpedo and gunfire attacks and laying a field of mines in Porsanger Fjord . The submarine was sunk on 12 May 1942 by depth charges from the German escort ships UJ-1101, UJ-1108 and UJ-1110.

Additionally, the German minesweeper M-22 was damaged on 5 November 1941 by a mine laid earlier from the submarine. K-23 also shelled the Norwegian fishing boat Start on 26 November 1941, wounding seven sailors.

References 

1939 ships
Ships built in the Soviet Union
Soviet K-class submarines
World War II submarines of the Soviet Union